Joseph Follmann Walter (born June 18, 1963) is a former American football tackle who played thirteen seasons with the Cincinnati Bengals in the National Football League.

He lives in Florence, Kentucky, and owns Joe Walter Media Management, which buys media advertising such as radio, TV, newspaper and direct mail.

References

1963 births
Living people
American football offensive linemen
Cincinnati Bengals players
Texas Tech Red Raiders football players
Ed Block Courage Award recipients